15th of May City is a 'new city' district in the Southern Area of Cairo, Egypt. Its cornerstone was laid in 1978 on an area of 6400 acres, which trippled to 18,000 acres by 2017. It was constructed to solve the problem of insufficient accommodation. However, after almost forty years, it had only 93,574 residents according to the 2017 census.

Name
The name was chosen to immortalize the memory of the Corrective Revolution (launched as the "Corrective Movement"), a reform program (officially just a change in policy) launched on 15 May 1971 by President Anwar Sadat. It involved purging Nasserist members of the government and security forces, often considered pro-Soviet and left-wing, and drumming up popular support by presenting the takeover as a continuation of the Egyptian Revolution of 1952, while at the same time radically changing track on issues of foreign policy, economy, and ideology. Sadat's Corrective Revolution also included the imprisonment of other political forces in Egypt, including liberals and Islamists.

Geography
The 15th of May is a new satellite city located in the Soutern Area of Cairo, and is administered by the New Urban Communities Authority.

Climate
Köppen-Geiger climate classification system classifies its climate as hot desert (BWh), as the rest of Egypt. Due to its closeness to Helwan, it has very similar averages.

Economy

Industry
The city of 15th of May has a group of factories for many products.

Trading
15th of May city has several shopping malls, supermarkets and shops.

Education
The city has a group of schools such as the El Mostaqbal school.

Higher Education
The Higher Institute of Engineering is the most important educational foundation in the city.

Religion
The city has a group of mosques as:

 Masjid al Jafari
 Aly Ibn Aby Taleb
 Mostafa Mosque
 Al Fardos Mosque
 Al Radwan
 Masjid El-Nour

And also the city has two churches:

St. Mark's Church 
Church of Saint virgin mary & st. Athnasyous

See also 
 Greater Cairo
 Helwan
 List of cities and towns in Egypt
 Maadi

References 

Populated places in Cairo Governorate
1978 establishments in Egypt
Populated places established in 1978
New towns started in the 1970s
New towns in Egypt
Cities in Egypt